Francesco Antonelli (born 22 July 1999) is an Italian professional footballer who plays as a midfielder for Serie D club Lumezzane.

References

External links
 
 

1999 births
Living people
Footballers from Rome
Italian footballers
Association football midfielders
Serie C players
Serie D players
Eccellenza players
S.S.D. Città di Campobasso players
F.C. Legnago Salus players
F.C. Lumezzane V.G.Z. A.S.D. players